"5 minutes avec toi" is a song performed by French-Israeli singer Amir Haddad. The song was released as a digital download on 15 February 2019 as the second single from his re-released third studio album Addictions.

Music video
A music video to accompany the release of "5 minutes avec toi" was first released onto YouTube on 12 April 2019 at a total length of five minutes and two seconds.

Track listing

Charts

Release history

References

2018 songs
2019 singles
Amir Haddad songs
Songs written by Nazim Khaled